Kiggins is an Irish surname meaning Mag Uiginn, or "son of the Viking,"  and may refer to:

People
John P. Kiggins, movie theatre magnate and former Mayor of Vancouver, Washington
John Kiggins, Union army soldier in the American Civil War who received the Medal of Honor
 Bob Kiggins, outlaw and cattle rustler, killed by lawman and gunfighter Bill Standifer in 1898 
 Lewis J. Kiggins, credited with naming Ohio City, Ohio in 1890

Places
Kiggins Theatre, Art Deco movie theatre named for John P. Kiggins, located in Vancouver, Washington.
John P. and Mary Kiggins House, listed on the National Register of Historic Places
 Kiggins Bowl, an area in Leverich Park in Vancouver, Washington, named for the geographical formation of the terrain
Kiggin, Colorado, a census designated place in Garfield County, Colorado

See also
Higgins (disambiguation)
List of American Civil War Medal of Honor recipients: G-L
List of places in Colorado: I-O

Surnames of Irish origin
Anglicised Irish-language surnames